Thomas Gatewood, Jr. (born March 7, 1950) is a former American football wide receiver in the National Football League. He was drafted by the New York Giants in the fifth round of the 1972 NFL Draft. He played college football at Notre Dame.

College career
While at Notre Dame, Gatewood set many receiving records, many of which were not broken until at least 30 years later. During his career he had 157 receptions for 2,283 yards and 19 touchdowns. In 1970, he was a consensus All-American after a then school record 77 receptions for 1,123 yards. The record was broken in 2006 by Jeff Samardzija who had 78. His 157 career receptions were also a record until 2006 when both Samardzija and Rhema McKnight broke it. Gatewood still holds the record for the most catches per game in a season with 7.7.

Professional career
Gatewood was drafted by the New York Giants in the fifth round of the 1972 NFL Draft. He played in seventeen games over two seasons, recording no receptions.

College Football Hall of Fame
On January 9, 2015, the National Football Foundation announced that Gatewood would be inducted into the College Football Hall of Fame later that year.

Personal life
His grandson, A.J. Dillon, is an American football running back for the Green Bay Packers, he played college football for Boston College.

References

External links
Notre Dame Fighting Irish bio
College Football Hall of Fame bio

1950 births
Living people
Players of American football from Baltimore
All-American college football players
American football tight ends
American football wide receivers
New York Giants players
Notre Dame Fighting Irish football players